This list of the Mesozoic life of South Dakota contains the various prehistoric life-forms whose fossilized remains have been reported from within the US state of South Dakota and are between 252.17 and 66 million years of age.

A

 Acipenser – or unidentified comparable form
 †Actinocamax
 †Actinosepia
 †Actinosepia canadensis
 †Adocus
 †Agerostrea
 †Agerostrea translucida
 †Aletridelphys
 †Aletridelphys florencae
 †Aletridelphys hatcheri
 †Allosaurus
  †Alphadon
 †Alphadon marshi
 †Amesoneuron
 †Amesoneuron FU37 – informal
 †Anatotitan
 †Anatotitan copei
 †Anisomyon
 †Anomia
 †Anomia gryphorhyncha
 †Antillocaprina
  †Anzu – type locality for genus
 †Anzu wyliei – type locality for species
  †Apatosaurus
 †Araucarioxylon
 †Araucarioxylon hoppertonae – type locality for species
  †Archelon – type locality for genus
 †Archelon ischryos
 †Archelon ischyros – type locality for species
 †Artocarpus – report made of unidentified related form or using admittedly obsolete nomenclature
 †Artocarpus lessigiana
 Aspideretes
 †Asplenium
 †Asplenium Dicksonianum
 †Axestemys – or unidentified comparable form
 †Axestemys splendida

B

  †Baculites
 †Baculites clinolobatus
 †Baculites compressus
 †Baculites grandis
 †Baculites larsoni
 †Baculites ovatus
 †Baculites yokoyamai
 †Bananogmius
 †Bananogmius evolutus
 †Baptornis
 †Baptornis varneri – type locality for species
  †Barosaurus – type locality for genus
 †Barosaurus lentus – type locality for species
  †Basilemys
 †Basilemys sinuosa
 †Belemnitella
 †Belemnitella bulbosa
 Beryx – or unidentified related form
 †Binneyites
 †Binneyites carlilensis
 †Bisonia
 †Bisonia niemii
 †Bolodon
 †Bolodon hydei – type locality for species
 †Borealosuchus
 †Borealosuchus sternbergii
 †Borissiakoceras – tentative report
 Brachidontes
  †Brachychampsa
 †Brachychampsa montana
 †Brodavis
 †Brodavis baileyi – type locality for species
 †Bubodens – type locality for genus
 †Bubodens magnus – type locality for species

C

 †Caenagnathus
  †Calycoceras
 †Calycoceras boreale – type locality for species
 †Calycoceras dromense – or unidentified comparable form
  †Camarasaurus
 Campeloma
 †Camptonectes
 †Camptonectes hallii
 †Carabites
 †Carabites russelli – type locality for species
 †Cataceramus – or unidentified comparable form
 †Cataceramus tenuilineatus
  †Caturus
 †Caturus dartoni – type locality for species
 †Celastrophyllum
 †Celastrophyllum pulchrum – type locality for species
  †Champsosaurus
 †Cimexomys
 †Cimolodon
 †Cimolodon nitidus
  †Cimolomys
 †Cimolomys gracilis
 †Cissites
 †Cissites ingens
 †Cissites salisburiaefolius
 †Claibornites
 †Claibornites cedrensis
 †Claosaurus
 †Claosaurus affinis – type locality for species
 †Clavipholas
  †Clidastes
 †Clidastes propython
 †Clisocolus
 †Clisocolus moreauensis
 †Cocculus
 †Cocculus flabella
  †Collignoniceras
 †Collignoniceras collisniger – type locality for species
 †Collignoniceras jorgenseni – type locality for species
 †Collignoniceras percarinatum
 †Collignoniceras praecox
 †Collignoniceras vermilionense
 †Collignoniceras woolgari
 †Collignoniceras woollgari
 †Compsemys
 †Compsemys victa
 Corbula
 †Corbula crassimarginata
 †Corbulamella
 †Corbulamella gregaria
 †Crassatellina
 †Crassatellina hollandi
 †Crenella
 †Crenella elegantula
 †Cretodus
  †Cretolamna
 †Cretolamna appendiculata
 †Cteniogenys
 †Cteniogenys antiquus
  Cucullaea
 †Cucullaea nebrascensis
 †Cupressinocladus
 †Cupressinocladus interruptus
 †Curculionites
 †Curculionites hylobioides – type locality for species
 †Curculionites northropi – type locality for species
 †Curculionites vulpinus – type locality for species
 †Cuspidaria
 †Cuspidaria moreauensis
 †Cuspidaria ventricosa
  †Cycadeoidea
 †Cycadeoidea aspera – type locality for species
 †Cycadeoidea cicatricula – type locality for species
 †Cycadeoidea colei – type locality for species
 †Cycadeoidea colossalis – type locality for species
 †Cycadeoidea dacotensis
 †Cycadeoidea excelsa – type locality for species
 †Cycadeoidea formosa – type locality for species
 †Cycadeoidea furcata – type locality for species
 †Cycadeoidea ingens – type locality for species
 †Cycadeoidea insolita – type locality for species
 †Cycadeoidea jenneyana
 †Cycadeoidea Jenneyana
 †Cycadeoidea marshiana – type locality for species
 †Cycadeoidea mcbridei – type locality for species
 †Cycadeoidea McBridei – type locality for species
 †Cycadeoidea minnekahtensis – type locality for species
 †Cycadeoidea nana – type locality for species
 †Cycadeoidea occidentalis – type locality for species
 †Cycadeoidea paynei – type locality for species
 †Cycadeoidea pulcherrima – type locality for species
 †Cycadeoidea stillwelli – type locality for species
 †Cycadeoidea turrita – type locality for species
 †Cycadeoidea Wellsii – type locality for species
 †Cyclurus
 †Cyclurus fragosus
 †Cymbophora
 †Cymbophora warrenana
 Cyrtodaria
 †Cyrtodaria minuta

D

 †Dakotadon
 †Dakotadon lakotaensis
  †Dakotaraptor – type locality for genus
 †Dakotaraptor steini – type locality for species
 †Dakoticancer
 †Dakoticancer overanus
 †Delphodon
 †Delphodon comptus – or unidentified comparable form
 †Desmatochelys
 †Desmatochelys lowi
  †Didelphodon
 †Didelphodon vorax – or unidentified comparable form
  †Diplodocus
 †Discoscaphites
 †Discoscaphites conradi
 †Discoscaphites gulosus
 †Discoscaphites rossi – type locality for species
  †Dolichorhynchops
 †Dolichorhynchops bonneri
 †Dolichorhynchops osborni
 †Dosiniopsis
 †Dosiniopsis deweyi
 †Drepanochilus
 †Drepanochilus evansi
 †Dryophyllum
 †Dryophyllum subfalcatum
 †Dryophyllum tenneseensis
 †Dunveganoceras
 †Dunveganoceras pondi

E

  †Edmontonia
 †Edmontonia longiceps
  †Edmontosaurus
  †Elasmosaurus
 †Elasmosaurus intermedius – type locality for species
 †Elatides
 †Elatides longifolia
 †Ellipsoscapha
 †Embaphias – type locality for genus
 †Embaphias circulosus – type locality for species
 †Enchodus
 †Erlingdorfia
 †Erlingdorfia montana
 †Ethmocardium
 †Ethmocardium welleri
 †Eubostrychoceras
 †Eubostrychoceras matsumotoi
 †Eucalycoceras
 †Eucalycoceras pentagonum
 †Eutrephoceras
 †Eutrephoceras dekayi

F

 †Fokieniopsis
 †Fokieniopsis catenulata

G

 †Galagadon – type locality for genus
 †Galagadon nordquistae – type locality for species
 †Geosternbergia
 †Geosternbergia maiseyi – type locality for species
 Gleichenia
 †Gleichenia Zippei
  †Globidens
 †Globidens alabamensis
 †Globidens dakotensis – type locality for species
 †Globidens schurmanni – type locality for species
 †Glossozamites
 †Glossozamites Fontaineanus – type locality for species
  †Glyptops
 Glyptostrobus
  †Glyptostrobus europaeus
 †Goniomya
 †Goniomya americana
  †Gorgosaurus
 †Grammatodon
 †Grammatodon sulcatinus
 †Granocardium
 †Granocardium whitei
 †Graphidula
 †Graphidula culbertsoni
 †Grewiopsis
 †Grewiopsis saportana
 †Gypsonictops
 †Gypsonictops hypoconus
 †Gyrostrea
 †Gyrostrea subtrigonalis

H

  †Hainosaurus
 †Hainosaurus neumilleri – type locality for species
 †Hamites
 †Hamites cimarronensis
 †Helopanoplia
 †Helopanoplia distincta
 Hemiaster
 †Hemiaster beecheri
 †Hercorhynchus
 †Hercorhynchus hollandi
  †Hesperornis
 †Hesperornis regalis – or unidentified comparable form
 Hiatella – tentative report
 †Hindsiella
 †Hindsiella corsonensis
 †Hoplitosaurus
 †Hoplitosaurus marshi – type locality for species
 †Hoploparia
 †Hoploscaphites
 †Hoploscaphites comprimus
 †Hoploscaphites melloi – type locality for species
 †Hoploscaphites nicolletii
  †Hulettia
 †Hulettia americana – type locality for species
 †Hypoxytoma
 †Hypoxytoma nebrascana
 †Hypsilophodon
 †Hypsilophodon wielandi – type locality for species

I

  †Ichthyodectes
 †Infernolestes – type locality for genus
 †Infernolestes rougieri – type locality for species
  †Inoceramus
 †Inoceramus apicalis
 †Inoceramus ginterensis
 †Inoceramus tenuis – or unidentified related form
 †Inoceramus tenuistriatus – tentative report
 †Ischyodus
 †Ischyodus rayhaasi
 Isurus

J

 †Jeletskytes
 †Jeletskytes nodosus
  †Jeletzkytes
 †Jeletzkytes dorfi
 †Jeletzkytes nebrascensis
 †Jeletzkytes spedeni – type locality for species
 Juliacorbula
 †Juliacorbula crassimarginata
 Jupiteria
 †Jupiteria scitula

L

 †Lakotalestes – type locality for genus
 †Lakotalestes luoi – type locality for species
  Lamna
 †Laurophyllum
 †Laurophyllum wardiana
 †Leepierceia
 †Leepierceia preartocarpoides
  †Leidyosuchus
 †Lemnaceae
 †Lemnaceae scutatum
  †Lepidotes – tentative report
 †Lepidotes lacotanus
 Lepisosteus
 †Lepisosteus occidentalis
 †Leptalestes
 †Leptalestes cooki
 †Leptalestes krejcii
 †Leptosolen
 Limopsis
 †Limopsis striatopunctatus
 †Lioplacodes
 †Lucina – tentative report

M

 Malletia
 †Malletia evansi
 †Marmarthia
 †Marmarthia pearsonii
 †Marmarthia trivialis
 †Melvius
 †Melvius thomasi
  †Meniscoessus
 †Meniscoessus robustus
 †Mesodma
 †Mesodma formosa
 †Mesodma hensleighi
 †Mesodma thompsoni
 †Modiolus
 †Modiolus attenuatus – or unidentified related form
 †Modiolus galpinianus
 †Modiolus meeki
  †Mosasaurus
 †Mosasaurus missouriensis – type locality for species
 †Myledaphus
 †Myledaphus bipartitus

N

  †Nelumbo
 †Nelumbo FU62 – informal
 †Neocardioceras
 †Neocardioceras transiens – type locality for species
 †Nonactaeonina
 †Nortedelphys
 †Nortedelphys jasoni
  Nucula
 †Nucula cancellata
 †Nucula percrassa
 †Nucula planomarginata
 Nuculana
 †Nuculana grandensis
 †Nuculana scitula
 †Nymphalucina
 †Nymphalucina occidentalis

O

 †Opertochasma
 †Opertochasma cuneatum
  †Ophiomorpha
 †Ophiomorpha nodosa
  †Ornithomimus
 †Osmakasaurus
 †Osmakasaurus depressus – type locality for species
 Ostrea
 †Ostrea translucida
 †Otoscaphites
 †Otoscaphites seabeensis
 †Oxytoma
 †Oxytoma nebrascana

P

  †Pachycephalosaurus – type locality for genus
 †Pachycephalosaurus wyomingensis – type locality for species
 †Pachyrhizodus
 †Pahasapasaurus – type locality for genus
 †Pahasapasaurus haasi – type locality for species
 †Paleoaster
 †Paleoaster inquirenda
  †Palmoxylon
 †Palmoxylon cheyennense
 Panopea
 †Panopea occidentalis
 †Paronychodon
 †Paronychodon lacustris
 †Passumys – type locality for genus
 †Passumys angelli – type locality for species
 †Pediomys
 †Pediomys elegans
 Periploma
 †Periploma subgracile
 †Phelopteria
 †Phelopteria linguaeformis
 †Phelopteria minuta
 †Phelopteria quadrate
 Pholadomya
 †Pholadomya deweyensis
 †Pistia – report made of unidentified related form or using admittedly obsolete nomenclature
 †Pistia corrugata
  †Placenticeras
 †Placenticeras pseudoplacenta
 †Platanites
 †Platanites marginata
 Platanus
 †Platanus cissoides
  †Platecarpus
 †Platecarpus somenensis – or unidentified comparable form
 †Platecarpus tympaniticus
 †Plesiobaena
 †Plesiobaena antiqua
 †Plioplatecarpus
 †Plioplatecarpus primaevus – type locality for species
 †Podozamites
 †Podozamites lanceolatus
 †Prionocyclus
 †Prionocyclus macombi
 †Prionocyclus novimexicanus
  †Prognathodon
 †Prognathodon overtoni – type locality for species
 †Proplacenticeras
 †Proplacenticeras stantoni
 †Protacanthoceras
 †Protacanthoceras proteus
 †Protalphadon
 †Protalphadon lulli – tentative report
 †Protocardia
 †Protocardia subquadrata
  †Protosphyraena
  †Protostega
 †Protostega marshii – type locality for species
 †Pseudoptera
 †Pseudoptera subtortuosa
  †Pteranodon
 †Pteranodon longiceps
 †Ptychodus
 †Ptychodus janewayii
 †Ptychodus occidentalis

Q

 Quercus
 †Quercus Wardiana
 †Quereuxia
 †Quereuxia angulata

R

 †Rhamnus
 †Rhamnus cleburni
 †Rhombopsis
 †Rhombopsis subturritus
  †Richardoestesia
 †Richardoestesia isosceles

S
 

 Sassafras
 †Sassafras Mudgii
 †Scaphites
 †Scaphites delicatulus
 †Semitriton
 †Semitriton buccinoides
 †Sequoia
 †Sequoia HC70 – informal
 †Serrifusus
 †Serrifusus dakotaensis
 Solemya
 †Solemya subplicata
 †Sourimis
 †Sourimis equilateralis
 Spaniorinus
 †Spaniorinus nicolleti
 Sphaerium
 †Sphenobaiera
 †Sphenobaiera ikorfatensis
 †Sphenodiscus
 †Sphenodiscus beecheri – tentative report
 †Sphenodiscus lobatus
 †Sphenodiscus pleurisepta
 †Spyridoceramus
 †Spyridoceramus tegulatus
  Squalicorax
 †Squalicorax falcatus
 Squalus
 †Stramentum
 †Stramentum haworthi
  †Styxosaurus
 †Styxosaurus browni
 †Styxosaurus snowii – type locality for species
 †Syncyclonema
 †Syncyclonema halli

T

 †Tancredia
 †Tancredia americana
 †Tarrantoceras
 †Tarrantoceras flexicostatum – or unidentified comparable form
 †Tatankaceratops – type locality for genus
 †Tatankaceratops sacrisonorum – type locality for species
 †Taxodiaceaepollenites
 Taxodium
 †Taxodium olrikii
 †Tellinimera
 †Tellinimera scitula
 †Tenuipteria
 †Tenuipteria fibrosa
  †Thescelosaurus
 †Thescelosaurus neglectus
 †Thespesius – type locality for genus
 †Thespesius occidentalis – type locality for species
 †Torosaurus
 †Torosaurus latus
 †Toxochelys
 †Toxochelys latiremis
 †Trachodon
 †Trachybaculites
 †Trachybaculites columna
 †Tragodesmoceras
 †Tragodesmoceras carlilense
 †Tragodesmoceras carlilensis
  †Triceratops
 †Triceratops horridus
 †Trochodendroides
 †Trochodendroides nebrascensis
  †Tylosaurus
 †Tylosaurus proriger
  †Tyrannosaurus
 †Tyrannosaurus rex

V

 †Vanikoropsis
 †Vanikoropsis nebrascensis
 †Viburnites
 †Viburnites Evansanus
  Viviparus

W

 †Willimactra

Y

 †Yezoites
 Yoldia
 †Yoldia lacrima
 †Yoldia rectangularis

Z

 Ziziphus
 †Ziziphus fibrillosus

References

 

South Dakota
Mesozoic